This article contains an overview of the year 1983 in athletics.

International Events
 Asian Championships
 Balkan Games
 Central American and Caribbean Championships
 European Indoor Championships
 Mediterranean Games
 Pan American Games
 South American Championships
 World Championships
 World Cross Country Championships
 World Student Games

World records

Men

Women

Men's Best Year Performers

100 metres
Main race this year: World Championships 100 metres

200 metres
Main race this year: World Championships 200 metres

400 metres
Main race this year: World Championships 400 metres

800 metres
Main race this year: World Championships 800 metres

1,500 metres
Main race this year: World Championships 1,500 metres

Mile

3,000 metres

5,000 metres
Main race this year: World Championships 5,000 metres

10,000 metres
Main race this year: World Championships 10,000 metres

Half Marathon

Marathon
Main race this year: World Championships Marathon

110m Hurdles
Main race this year: World Championships 110m Hurdles

400m Hurdles
Main race this year: World Championships 400m Hurdles

3,000m Steeplechase
Main race this year: World Championships 3,000m Steeplechase

High Jump
Main competition this year: World Championships High Jump

Long Jump
Main competition this year: World Championships Long Jump

Triple Jump
Main competition this year: World Championships Triple Jump

Discus
Main competition this year: World Championships Discus Throw

Hammer

Shot Put
Main competition this year: World Championships Shot Put

Javelin (old design)
Main competition this year: World Championships Javelin Throw

Pole Vault
Main competition this year: World Championships Pole Vault

Decathlon
Main competition this year: World Championships Decathlon

Women's Best Year Performers

100 metres
Main race this year: World Championships 100 metres

200 metres
Main race this year: World Championships 200 metres

400 metres
Main race this year: World Championships 400 metres

800 metres
Main race this year: World Championships 800 metres

1,500 metres
Main race this year: World Championships 1,500 metres

3,000 metres
Main race this year: World Championships 3,000 metres

5,000 metres

10,000 metres

Half Marathon

Marathon
Main race this year: World Championships Marathon

100m Hurdles
Main race this year: World Championships 100m Hurdles

400m Hurdles
Main race this year: World Championships 400m Hurdles

High Jump
Main competition this year: World Championships High Jump

Long Jump
Main competition this year: World Championships Long Jump

Discus
Main competition this year: World Championships Discus Throw

Shot Put
Main competition this year: World Championships Shot Put

Javelin (old design)
Main competition this year: World Championships Javelin Throw

Heptathlon
Main competition this year: World Championships Heptathlon

Births
 January 4 — Laura Douglas, Welsh hammer thrower
 January 7 — Marc Burns, Trinidad and Tobago athlete
 January 7 — Stéphanie Falzon, French hammer thrower
 January 11 — Cui Zhide, Chinese race walker
 January 16 — Trevell Quinley, American long jumper
 January 26 — Arturo Casado, Spanish middle distance runner
 January 28 — Chiara Rosa, Italian shot putter
 February 1 — Alice Timbilili, Kenyan distance runner
 February 2 — Athanasia Perra, Greek triple jumper
 March 10 — Yelena Bolsun, Russian sprinter
 March 14 — Jiang Qiuyan, Chinese race walker
 March 21 — Martina Hrašnová, Slovak hammer thrower
 March 21 — Jussi Heikkilä, Finnish hurdler
 March 22 — André Pollmächer, German long-distance runner
 March 23 — Mo Farah, Somali-British distance runner
 March 28 — Jurica Grabušić, Croatian hurdler
 April 25 — Nick Willis, New Zealand middle distance runner
 May 5 — Mabel Gay, Cuban triple jumper
 June 4 — Satoshi Osaki, Japanese long-distance runner
 July 12 — Yarelis Barrios, Cuban discus thrower
 July 18 — Mikk Pahapill, Estonian decathlete
 July 20 — Ignisious Gaisah, Ghanaian athlete
 August 2 — Zuzana Malíková, Slovak race walker
 August 4 — Fábio Gomes da Silva, Brazilian pole vaulter
 September 2 — Tatyana Kozlova, Russian race walker
 September 11 — Vivian Cheruiyot, Kenyan distance runner
 September 14 — Mestawet Tufa, Ethiopian distance runner
 October 2 — Michael Kipyego, Kenyan runner
 October 5 — Hamid Ezzine, Moroccan long-distance runner
 October 6 — Leonid Andreev, Uzbekistani decathlete and pole vaulter
 October 8 — Mihkel Kukk, Estonian javelin thrower
 October 10 — Dong Jimin, Chinese race walker
 October 22 — Mika Vasara, Finnish shot putter
 October 22 — Li Zhuhong, Chinese long-distance runner
 November 19 — Meseret Defar, Ethiopian distance runner
 December 2 — Yelena Priyma, Russian hammer thrower
 December 6 — Urszula Piwnicka, Polish javelin thrower
 December 8 — Aliaksandr Kazulka, Belarusian hammer thrower
 December 9 — Diana Pickler, American heptathlete
 December 13 — Janeth Jepkosgei, Kenyan middle distance runner
 December 22 — Viola Kibiwot, Kenyan middle distance runner
 December 27 — Tomo Morimoto, Japanese long-distance runner

Deaths
 January 21 — Antonio Siddi (59), Italian athlete (b. 1923)
 January 24 — Juan Carlos Zabala (71), Argentine athlete (b. 1911)
 February 14 — Lina Radke (79), German athlete (b. 1903)
 September 12 — Sabin Carr (79), American pole vaulter (b. 1904)

References
 Association of Road Racing Statisticians
 Year Rankings

 
Athletics (track and field) by year